Jolfa (also Romanized as Jolfā, Julfa, and Dzhulfi) is a city in the Central District of Jolfa County, East Azerbaijan province, Iran, and serves as capital of the county. At the 2006 census, its population was 4,983 in 1,365 households. The following census in 2011 counted 5,628 people in 1,448 households. The latest census in 2016 showed a population of 8,810 people in 2,543 households. All residents of Julfa are Azerbaijanis.

Monuments

 Saint Stepanos Monastery 
 Jolfa Water Mill 
 Chapel of Chupan

References 

Jolfa County

Cities in East Azerbaijan Province

Populated places in East Azerbaijan Province

Populated places in Jolfa County